A paternoster lake is one of a series of glacial lakes connected by a single stream or a braided stream system. The name comes from the word Paternoster, another name for the Lord's Prayer derived from the Latin words for the prayer's opening words, "Our Father"; Paternoster lakes are so called because of their resemblance to rosary beads, with alternating prayer beads connected by a string or fine chain.

Paternoster lakes occur in alpine valleys, climbing one after the other to the valley's head, called a corrie, which often contains a cirque lake. Paternoster lakes are created by recessional moraines, or rock dams, that are formed by the advance and subsequent upstream retreat and melting of the ice. The local variation in rock types can also be a factor in creating these lakes. A glacier encountering weaker rocks at its base, will be able to erode deeper than when it experiences harder, less erodible rocks. As the glacier melts, lakes form where weaker rock was excavated.

Excellent examples of this occur in California's Sierra Nevada, where many stream courses above 3000 m in elevation contain paternoster lakes. 

Glacier National park provides another example of paternoster lakes. Five lakes in a row; Lake Sherburne, Swiftcurrent Lake, Lake Josephine, Grinnell Lake, and Upper Grinnell Lake all form a nice "rosary" that has produced some spectacular photographs. The U shape of the valley confirms that it was formed by a glacier long ago, as opposed to a V shaped valley cut by a river.  
 
More good examples of paternoster lakes can be found in Waterton Lakes National Park, Canada. The three Carthew lakes are in a hanging cirque, reflecting their glacial origins, with Anderson Lake lower in elevation but still clearly part of this paternoster lake procession. 

Another good example can be found in Yoho National Park, Canada. Lake OHara, Lake Oesa, and the large pools in the stream that connect the two give a total of five stair-stepped lakes/ponds. The presence of a rock glacier in the area points strongly to the glacial origins of this chain of lakes.

Notes